Anastasia Lebedeva (born 20 May 1993) is a Russian rower. She competed in the women's lightweight double sculls event at the 2020 Summer Olympics.

References

External links
 

1993 births
Living people
Russian female rowers
Olympic rowers of Russia
Rowers at the 2020 Summer Olympics
Rowers from Moscow